Sipaliwini River, river in Suriname
 Sipaliwini District, district in Suriname
 Sipaliwini Savanna (town), also called Sipaliwini, town in Suriname, in the Sipaliwini District
 Sipaliwini Airstrip, an airstrip in Sipaliwini Savana